The Armenian Shooting Federation, also known as the Shooting Federation of Armenia, is the regulating body of shooting in Armenia, governed by the Armenian Olympic Committee. The headquarters of the federation is located in Yerevan.

History
The Federation was established in 1993 and the current president is Arthur Hovhannisyan. The Federation is a full member of the International Shooting Sport Federation and the European Shooting Confederation. Armenian athletes participate in various European and international level shooting championships, including the ISSF World Shooting Championships and participate in shooting at the Summer Olympics.

See also
 Practical Shooting Federation of Armenia
 Sport in Armenia

References

External links 
 Armenian Shooting Federation on Facebook

Sports governing bodies in Armenia
Shooting sports in Armenia
National members of the European Shooting Confederation